Tuguegarao longganisa, also known as the Ybanag longganisa, is a Filipino pork sausage originating from the Ybanag people of Tuguegarao City, Cagayan. It is a type of de recado longganisa. It is made with coarsely ground pork, black pepper, garlic, coarse salt, and cane vinegar (ideally sukang iloko) in hog casings. It is typically dyed orange with achuete oil.

See also
 List of sausages

References

Philippine sausages